Constantin Nistor may refer to:

 Constantin Nistor (footballer) (born 1991), Romanian football player
 Constantin Nistor (ice hockey) (born 1954), former Romanian ice hockey player